Lâg Guitars is a French music company founded in the Occitania region of France by luthier Michel Lâg-Chavarria in 1980. Lâg produces various acoustic guitars, smart guitars and ukuleles. They are designed in the south of France. 

Notable players of Lâg guitars include Phil Campbell of Motörhead and Charles Hedger of Cradle of Filth.

Bibliography
 Blue Book of Electric Guitars By Zachary R. Fjestad, S. P. Fjestad

References

External links
 

Musical instrument manufacturing companies of France
Guitar manufacturing companies
French brands